The 1992 Toray Pan Pacific Open was a women's tennis tournament played on indoor carpet courts at the Tokyo Metropolitan Gymnasium in Tokyo, Japan that was part of the Tier II Series of the 1992 WTA Tour. It was the 9th edition of the Pan Pacific Open and took place from 28 January through 2 February 1992. First-seeded Gabriela Sabatini won the singles title and earned $70,000 first-prize money as well as 300 ranking points.

Finals

Singles
 Gabriela Sabatini defeated   Martina Navratilova 6–2, 4–6, 6–2
 It was Sabatini's 2nd singles title of the year and the 22nd of her career.

Doubles
 Arantxa Sánchez Vicario /  Helena Suková  defeated  Martina Navratilova /  Pam Shriver 7–5, 6–1

References

External links
 ITF tournament edition details
 Tournament draws

Toray Pan Pacific Open
Pan Pacific Open
 
Toray Pan Pacific Open
Toray Pan Pacific Open
Toray Pan Pacific Open
Toray Pan Pacific Open